Clanidopsis is a genus of moths in the family Sphingidae, containing only one species Clanidopsis exusta, the white-streaked hawkmoth. The genus was erected by Walter Rothschild and Karl Jordan in 1903 and the species was first described by Arthur Gardiner Butler in 1875.

Distribution 
Is found from northern Pakistan (Margalla Hills) and north-western India, eastward along the southern slopes of the Himalayas to central Nepal and neighbouring parts of Tibet and Hubei in China.

Description 
The wingspan is 70–96 mm. It is similar to Clanis species, but the proboscis is much shorter and the forewing is broader and not falcate apically. The forewing underside is lacking a black streak posterior to the discal cell and the hindwing upperside is lacking the black basal patch.

Biology 
The larvae have been recorded feeding on Indigofera species in India.

References

Smerinthini
Monotypic moth genera
Taxa named by Walter Rothschild
Taxa named by Karl Jordan
Moths of Asia